The Slachter's Nek Rebellion was an uprising by Boers in 1815 on the eastern border of the Cape Colony.

Background
In 1815 a farmer from the eastern border of the Cape Colony, Frederik Bezuidenhout, was summoned to appear before a magistrate's court after repeated allegations of mistreating one of his Khoi labourers. Bezuidenhout resisted arrest and fled to a cave near his home, where he defended himself against the Coloured soldiers sent to capture him. When he refused to surrender, he was shot dead by one of the soldiers.

Uprising
Hendrik Prinsloo, along with a neighbour Hans Bezuidenhout organised an uprising against the British colonial authority, which was believed, by the Boers (Afrikaner farmers) to be hostile towards themselves and to favour Blacks and Coloureds above the Afrikaner farmers. The Boers also had more than 3,600 cattle stolen and felt the British were not doing enough to protect them from the attacks by the Xhosa. On 18 November a commando of rebels met an armed force sent by Colonel Jacob Cuyler, the military commander and Landdrost (magistrate) on the eastern borders, at Slachter's Nek.

Negotiations failed, and the majority of the rebels left without any shots being fired. Twenty rebels surrendered, followed by several more over the following few days. However, some of the leaders, among whom was Hans Bezuidenhout, refused to turn themselves over to the authorities. On 29 November they were attacked by colonial troops. Everybody but Bezuidenhout and his family surrendered, and like his brother, Hans died while resisting arrest.

Aftermath
The rebels were tried at Uitenhage.

Names of accused
 Hendrik Frederik Prinsloo,
 Nicolaas Balthazar Prinsloo, Marts-son,
 Willem Jacobus Prinsloo, Wm-son,
 Nicolaas Prinsloo, Wm-son,
 Willem Prinsloo, Ns-son,
 Johannes Prinsloo, M.son,
 Willem Krugel,
 Hendrik van der Nes,
 Cornelis van der Nes,
 Stoffel Rudolph Botha,
 Willem Adriaan Nel,
 Thomas Andries Dreyer,
 Johannes Bronkhorst,
 Hendrik Petrus Klopper,
 Jacobus Klopper, and
 Petrus Laurens Erasmus
 Joachim Johaunes Prinslo and
 Johannes Frederik Botha.
 Hendrik Frederik Prinsloo
 Nicolaas Balthazar Prinsloo. (He took part in the Great Trek and was murdered with the van Rensburg trek party at Djindispruit, Limpopo River, Mozambique at the end of July 1836.)

Some were acquitted, but six of the rebels were sentenced to death, one of these was pardoned by the Governor. On 9 March 1816, the remaining five were hanged in public at Van Aardtspos. Four of the nooses broke during the procedure and the still living convicts, together with many spectators, pleaded for their lives, but the executioner ordered them to be hanged a second time.

The rebellion and the consequent executions of the rebels have acquired special significance among contemporary South African historians as the beginning of an Afrikaner struggle against British colonial rule.

References

Notes

Citations

Sources

Further reading

 
 
 

1815 in South Africa
19th century in Africa
Cape Colony
Conflicts in 1815
Military history of South Africa